Kientzheim (Alsatian: Kientza) is a former commune in the Haut-Rhin department in north-eastern France. On 1 January 2016, it was merged into the new commune Kaysersberg Vignoble.

Population

Education
Previously the local elementary school was École élémentaire publique école primaire publique.

The Lycée Seijo, a Japanese boarding school, operated in Kientzheim from 1986 to 2005. The European Centre for Japanese Studies in Alsace (CEEJA,  Aruzasu Ōshū Nihongaku Kenkyūsho) opened at the site of the former school.

See also

 Communes of the Haut-Rhin département

References

External links

Former communes of Haut-Rhin